Stieneke Jannieta Femmelien van der Graaf (born 7 October 1984) is a Dutch politician and jurist who since 2022 has served as a member of the House of Representatives for the Christian Union (CU). She previously held a seat in the House from 2017 to 2021, with a brief interruption in 2019, when she was replaced by Nico Drost during her maternity leave. She started her political career in 2007 as party leader in the Provincial Council of Groningen.

References

External links
  Parlement.com biography

1984 births
Living people
21st-century Dutch jurists
21st-century Dutch politicians
21st-century Dutch women politicians
Christian Union (Netherlands) politicians
Dutch Protestants
Dutch women jurists
Members of the House of Representatives (Netherlands)
Members of the Provincial Council of Groningen
People from Zwartewaterland
University of Groningen alumni
20th-century Dutch women